Joaquín Carlos "Joaco" Cañas García (born 30 August 1987) is a Spanish footballer who plays as a defender for Philippines Football League (PFL) club Cebu.

Career

In 2006, Joaco Cañas began his professional football career playing for CD Puerta Bonita at the age of 17. He played for AD Colmenar Viejo and Internacional de Madrid before moving to the Philippines in 2012. From 2012 to 2017, Joaco Cañas played in the United Football League (UFL) with Stallion F.C. (2012/2013) and with Loyola (2013/2017). He moved to the Maldives in 2018 to play for Victory Sports Club. He then went back to the Philippines in 2019 and in 2020 he played for Maharlika Manila F.C.

Cañas joined Cebu F.C. in 2021.

References

External links
 Interview 1 (Audio)
 Interview 2 (Audio)

1987 births
Living people
Spanish footballers
Spanish expatriate footballers
Spanish expatriate sportspeople in the Philippines
F.C. Meralco Manila players
Association football defenders
Cebu F.C. players